The Key to Paradise is a 1970 Danish family film directed by Sven Methling and starring Dirch Passer.

Cast
 Dirch Passer - Gudmund (priest and travel agent)
 Lone Hertz - Gabriella 'Gaby' Secretary to St. Peter
 Jørgen Ryg - Portier
 Else-Marie Juul Hansen - Permanent Secretary Agnes Kirkegård
 Preben Mahrt - Menighedsrådsformand
 Vera Gebuhr - Marie
 Jørgen Kiil - Young man getting married
 Sisse Reingaard - Young woman getting married
 Arne Møller - Drunk man
 Emil Hass Christensen - Finance minister
 Bjørn Puggaard-Müller - Church minister
 Carl Ottosen - Christian IV
 Suzanne Bech - The maid
 Jørgen Buckhøj - The pilot
 Ib Makwarth - Photographer
 John Larsen - The Doctor
 Lone Lindorff - The fitness trainer

References

External links

1970 films
Danish children's films
1970s Danish-language films
Films directed by Sven Methling
ASA Filmudlejning films